Anthony J. Stella (June 19, 1928 – October 1978) was an American politician who served in the New York State Assembly in 1966 and from 1969 to 1974. Tony Stella was a Reform Democrat all his life. He was very close with Robert Abrams and other Reform Democrats

References

1928 births
1978 deaths
Democratic Party members of the New York State Assembly
20th-century American politicians